Hamad Rakea Al Anezi (born April 22, 1984) is a Bahraini footballer currently playing for Al-Riffa of Bahrain and the Bahrain national football team. Hamad was banned by WADA for 24 months after testing positive for steroids. He returned to playing football on 1 June 2010.

National team career statistics

Goals for Senior National Team

External links
 
http://www.espnfc.us/player/117916/hamed-rakea-al-anezi

1984 births
Living people
Bahraini footballers
2011 AFC Asian Cup players
Banned sportspeople
Doping cases in association football
Bahraini sportspeople in doping cases
Footballers at the 2006 Asian Games
Association football midfielders
Asian Games competitors for Bahrain
Bahrain international footballers